Ioan Kiss (1902 – 19 November 2006) was a Romanian footballer who played as a goalkeeper.

International career
Ioan Kiss played four friendly matches for Romania, making his debut on 25 April 1926 under coach Teofil Morariu in a 6–1 victory against Bulgaria.

Scores and results table. Romania's goal tally first:

References

External links
 

1902 births
2006 deaths
Romanian footballers
Romania international footballers
Place of birth missing
Association football goalkeepers
Liga I players
CSM Jiul Petroșani players
Romanian centenarians